The Mark 35 torpedo was the first of the United States Navy deep-diving anti-submarine torpedoes designed for surface launch. This electrically propelled 21-inch (53-cm) torpedo was 162 inches (4.11 m) long, weighed 1770 lb (803 kg), and carried a 270 lb (122.5 kg) Torpex high explosive warhead. This torpedo used one of the earliest active guidance systems and was introduced in 1949, and was classified as obsolete in the 1960s.

The Mark 35 torpedo was originally specified as the intended payload for the Grebe missile, before being replaced by the Mark 41 due to weight concerns.

Mark 41 torpedo 
A simplified and lighter weight version of the Mark 35 was developed, specifically for air-launched use. This eliminated any equipment not needed for air-launching, saving 450 lbs.
 The nose also became distinctively flat-fronted.

This torpedo was used as the payload in some ASW missiles, the AUM-N-2 Petrel and the SUM-N-2 Grebe.

See also
American 21 inch torpedo

References

Citations

Bibliography

 

Torpedoes of the United States
Cold War anti-submarine weapons of the United States